Wee Stories theatre company was established in 1995.  The company has received nominations and awards from TMA Awards and Critics Awards for Theatre in Scotland. Wee Stories is based in Edinburgh, Scotland and tours to school halls, village halls and theatres of all scales in Scotland and the United Kingdom.

History
Founded in 1995 by Creative Director Andy Cannon and General Manager Lara Bowen, the company was set up as a non-profit storytelling theatre company for children and families. Wee Stories' productions are created for audiences of all ages, describing their work as child-friendly rather than for children.

Creative directors
Andy Cannon was the Creative Director of Wee Stories from 1995 - 2011. He is now an Associate Artist with the company.

Iain Johnstone was a regular collaborator of the company since 1999, writing scripts, music and lyrics, performing in and directing Wee Stories productions. Johnstone was appointed Co-Creative Director in 2005. In 2011, he was appointed as Artistic Director.

Andy Cannon and Iain Johnstone have performed, written and directed the bulk of the company's work together, and have a reputation for presenting work to intergenerational audiences.

Productions
1995
 Ivan - schools tour, December.

1996
 Oops! - autumn.
 Spring and the Selfish Giant - schools tour, December.

1997
 A Duck called Ping - February and June.
 Sir Janet - autumn and spring.
 The Singing Ringing Tree - December.

1998
 Know Nothing Norman - February.
 Labyrinth - October.
 A Christmas Carol - December.

1999
 Labyrinth - August.
 The Loch Ness Affair - autumn.
 Rashiecoat - December.

2000
 Laird’s New Kilt - May–July.
 Pilot Project at Museum of Scotland, October.
 Peter Pan with Shona Reppe - December.

2001
 The Tale of the Hare and the Tortoise - (Wee Stories Early Years Project) February.
 Treasure Island - spring–autumn.
 Molly Whuppie - (Wee Stories Early Years Project) December.
 Peter Pan with Shona Reppe - December.

2002
 Tae a Mouse and A’ That - (National Museum of Scotland), January.
 A Wolf’s Tale - (National Museum of Scotland), February.
 Treasure Island - spring and autumn.
 Wee Witches - (Wee Stories Early Years Project), May.
 A Christmas Carol - December.

2003
 Labyrinth - spring.
 Quest - spring.
 Quangle Wangle - (Wee Stories Early Years Project), spring.
 Excalibur - summer.
 Arthur, the Story of a King - autumn.
 A Christmas Carol - December.

2004
 Arthur, the Story of a King - spring.
 Treasure Island - summer.
 Tam O’Shanter - autumn.
 The Emperor’s New Kilt - winter.

2005
 Treasure Island - spring.
 Labyrinth - summer.
 Arthur, the Story of a King - autumn.
 Peter Pan - winter.

2006
 Is This a Dagger? - autumn.
 Jock and the Beanstalk - winter.

2007
 Tam O’Shanter - spring.
 One Small Step - autumn.
 Jock and the Beanstalk - winter.

2008
 The Emperor’s New Kilt - (a co-production with the National Theatre of Scotland), spring.
 One Giant Leap - (a co-production with the National Theatre of Scotland), autumn.
 Bad King Wenceslas - schools tour, December.

2009
 One Giant Leap - spring.
 Once Upon a Time Machine - spring.
 The Sun, the Moon and a Boy called River - autumn.
 Spring and the Selfish Giant - schools tour, December.

2010
 Treasure Island - spring.
 The Sun, the Moon and a Boy called River - spring.
 Jock and the Beanstalk - winter.
 The Selfish Giant - winter.

2011
 Is This a Dagger? The Story of Macbeth - spring.
 Arthur, the Story of a King - autumn.

2012
 One Giant Leap - spring.
 The Sun, the Moon and a Boy called River - South of Scotland tour, summer.
 A Dream on Midsummer's Night - Scotland tour, autumn.

2013
 Hickory and Dickory Dock - spring, touring with One Giant Leap.
 One Giant Leap - Edinburgh Festival Fringe as part of Made in Scotland, summer.
 Hickory and Dickory Dock/One Giant Leap - double bill tour, autumn.
 The Selfish Giant - Christmas show at the Festival Theatre Studio, winter.

Awards
Awards:
For The Emperor’s New Kilt, a co-production with the National Theatre of Scotland, (2008)
 Critics Awards for Theatre in Scotland [CATS] ‘Best Production for Children and Young People’.

For Arthur, the Story of a King (2004)
 TMA Awards for ‘Best Show for Children and Young People’;
 Critics' Awards for Theatre in Scotland [CATS] for ‘Best Production for Children and Young People’.

For Labyrinth (1999)
 Herald Angel Award.

Nominations:
For The Emperor’s New Kilt (2008)
 TMA Awards for Best Show for Children and Young People;
 Critics' Awards for Theatre in Scotland Award for Best Design: Becky Minto;
 Critics' Awards for Theatre in Scotland Award for Best Direction: Andy Cannon & Iain Johnstone;
 Critics' Awards for Theatre in Scotland Award for Best Use of Music and Sound: David Trouton
 Critics' Awards for Theatre in Scotland Award for Best Production.

For Arthur, the Story of a King (2004)
 Critics' Awards for Theatre in Scotland Award for Best Director: Andy Cannon & Iain Johnstone;
 Critics' Awards for Theatre in Scotland Award for Best Production.

References

External links

Theatre companies in Scotland